Hans-Jürgen Gerhardt (born 5 September 1954 in Altenburg, Thuringia) is an East German bobsledder who competed in the late 1970s and early 1980s. At the 1980 Winter Olympics in Lake Placid, he won two medals with a gold in the four-man and a silver in the two-man events.

Gerhardt also won five medals at the FIBT World Championships with three golds (Two-man: 1981, Four-man: 1977, 1981), one silver (Four-man: 1979), and one bronze (Four-man: 1978).

Gerhardt later married Olympic figure skater Kerstin Stolfig.

References
 Bobsleigh two-man Olympic medalists 1932–56 and since 1964
 Bobsleigh four-man Olympic medalists for 1924, 1932–56, and since 1964
 Bobsleigh two-man world championship medalists since 1931
 Bobsleigh four-man world championship medalists since 1930
 BrainyHistory.com profile

1954 births
Living people
People from Altenburg
German male hurdlers
German male bobsledders
Bobsledders at the 1980 Winter Olympics
Olympic bobsledders of East Germany
Olympic gold medalists for East Germany
Olympic silver medalists for East Germany
Olympic medalists in bobsleigh
Sportspeople from Thuringia
Medalists at the 1980 Winter Olympics